Park Min  (born 6 May 1986) is a South Korean footballer who plays as centre back for Bucheon FC in the K League 2.

Personal life 
In July 2022, Park announced that he would be marrying comedian Oh Na-mi in September 2022.

Club career
Park started his professionally in Gyeongnam FC. He scored twice his first match against Jeonbuk Hyundai Motors in the Peace Cup Korea.

Career statistics

References

External links 

1986 births
Living people
Association football midfielders
South Korean footballers
Gyeongnam FC players
Gwangju FC players
Gangwon FC players
FC Anyang players
Hwaseong FC players
Bucheon FC 1995 players
K3 League players
K League 1 players
K League 2 players
Footballers from Seoul